This is a list of diplomatic missions of Grenada. Grenada has a modest number of diplomatic missions appropriate to the country's size. Its embassy and mission to the European Union in Brussels and its embassy in Morocco is shared with other East Caribbean states.

Africa
 
 Rabat (Embassy)

Americas

 Toronto (Consulate-General)

 Havana (Embassy)

 Washington, D.C. (Embassy)
 Miami (Consulate-General)
 New York City (Consulate-General)

 Caracas (Embassy)

Asia

 Beijing (Embassy)

 Dubai (Consulate-General)

Europe

 Brussels (Embassy)

 Moscow (Embassy)

 London (High Commission)

Multilateral organisations
 
Brussels (Mission)
 
Geneva (Permanent Mission)
New York City (Permanent Mission)
 
Washington, D.C. (Permanent mission)

Gallery

See also
 Foreign relations of Grenada

External reference
High Commission for Grenada, London, UK
Consulate-General of Grenada in Dubai, UAE
Consulate-General of Grenada in Miami, USA
Consulate-General of Grenada in Toronto, Canada
Embassy of Grenada in Washington DC, USA
Embassy of Grenada in Beijing, China
Permanent Mission of Grenada to the UN, New York, USA
Ministry of Foreign Affairs, St. George's, Grenada
Embassy of Grenada in Moscow, Russia
Grenada Honorary Consulate in Hong Kong, Hong Kong SAR

References

 
Diplomatic missions
Grenada
Diplomatic missions